Dublin's Q102 is a commercial radio station in Dublin, owned by Wireless Group which is in turn owned by News UK. It broadcasts on 102.2 MHz FM. The station is licensed to target the 35+ age group, and must provide hourly news, as well as current events programming. It broadcasts under a contract from the Broadcasting Authority of Ireland.  Q102 broadcasts from Macken House in Dublin's Docklands.

The station was launched as Lite 102.2. On purchasing the station, UTV rebranded it to Dublin's Q102 thanks to research of Dublin people aged over 35, who decided on bringing back the name of a former pirate radio station.

Relaunch
The station's relaunch was orchestrated by former Big Brother UK contestant Ray Shah, who took over the station until it was relaunched. The take over involved a defacement of Lite 102.2's website and the constant playing of "Mah Nà Mah Nà" during the transition period. The station's Radio Data System PS name was changed to MUPPET during this time, before settling on Q102 afterwards. The first song played on the new Dublin's Q102 was "Night Fever" by The Bee Gees followed by "What About Me" by Shannon Noll.

Programming
The station broadcasts mainly adult contemporary music aimed at the 35+ age group. The station broadcasts news on the hour (half-hour at peak times) along with sports, traffic and weather updates.

Presenters
 Aidan Cooney (Q102 Breakfast with Aidan & Venetia)
 Venetia Quick (Q102 Breakfast with Aidan & Venetia)
 Andy Preston (The Feel Good Workday)
 Liam Coburn (The Feel Good Drive)
 Debbie Allen (The LoveZone (Mon-Thurs) / The Feel Good 80's Party (Fri))
 Hazel Nolan (Weekend Sports Breakfast)
 Paul Bradley (Saturday Breakfast / Sunday Mid-Mornings)
 Johnny Bowe (Saturday Mid-Mornings / Sunday Afternoon)
 Martin King (Saturday Afternoon)
 Lisa Armstrong (The Feel Good 80's Party (Sat) / The LoveZone (Sun))
 Miriam Maher (An Blas Beag)
 Lynsey Dolan (Overnights / Sunday Breakfast)

Q102 News
Q102's News output, is branded on air as Q102 Live. Intro of the updates reference the various ways of accessing Q102 (FM, Online, Mobile, Smartspeaker). The news focus is local to Dublin, with coverage of national public interest stories, and major international events. Main news bulletins are simulcast on sister station, FM104

Q102 News Team
 Kevin O’Mahony (Head of News)
 Hazel Nolan
 Louise Phelan D'Cruz
 Alison O’Reilly

Q102 sports reporter
 Peter Branigan

External links
 

Adult contemporary radio stations in Ireland
Mass media in Dublin (city)
Radio stations in the Republic of Ireland
Wireless Group
Radio stations established in 2000